Jhoja (Joja; Hindi: जोजा; Gujarati: જોજા; Punjabi: ਜੋਜਾ (ਝੋਜਾ)) is a Rajput surname among Kshatriya Hindus and Sikhs of North India.

References 

Surnames
Indian surnames
Surnames of Indian origin